El día que cambió la historia is a 2011 Argentine documentary directed by Sergio Pérez and Jorge Pastor Asuaje film. It features Lito Cruz, Rubén Stella, Micaela Cruz and Amelia Bence.

References

Argentine documentary films
2011 films
2010s Argentine films
2011 documentary films
2010s Spanish-language films